Hamid Reza Gholipour (born 26 June 1988) is an Iranian wushu athlete. He is the five-time Wushu World Champion. Gholipour received a four-year ban after testing positive for the anabolic steroid nandrolone, starting in October 2019, and  disqualified from the 15th World Wushu Championships in Shanghai, and the results at the competition forfeited.

References

1988 births
Living people
Iranian wushu practitioners
Iranian sanshou practitioners
Asian Games gold medalists for Iran
Asian Games medalists in wushu
Wushu practitioners at the 2010 Asian Games
Medalists at the 2010 Asian Games
Iranian sportspeople in doping cases
World Games medalists in wushu